The discography of Hurricane No. 1, an English rock band, consists of three studio albums, one extended plays and nine singles.

Studio albums

Compilation albums

Extended plays

Singles

 “Remote Control” originally failed to chart in the Top 75 at No.98 due to an error in the charts computer system that week, causing sales from certain chains to be omitted. The chart position shown is from the revised chart when the data was later found and compiled into the listing.

References 
 Footnotes

 Citations

Sources

 
 

Rock music group discographies
Discographies of British artists
Alternative rock discographies